Lüzhu, also called Liang (died 300) was an Ancient Chinese dancer, singer and music teacher.  

She was bought by Shi Chong (249–300), an official of Emperor Wu of Jin, and became his concubine. She became famous for her artistry and beauty, as she entertained his guests as a singer, a flute player and a dancer. She also composed music, and made poetry into songs by composing music for it. The famous composition Aonao qu has been attributed to both her as well as to Shi Chong. When a representative from the Imperial court demanded to buy her, Shi Chong refused to sell.  Shi Chong was then ordered to commit suicide, upon which Lüzhu herself committed suicide. Lüzhu is depicted in the Wu Shuang Pu (無雙譜, Table of Peerless Heroes) by Jin Guliang.

References

External links
(Chinese language) Lüzhu on the site of Baidu Baike

300 deaths
3rd-century Chinese people
3rd-century Chinese women
Ancient dancers
Ancient music composers
Ancient singers
Ancient slaves
Chinese concubines
Chinese slaves
Chinese women singers
Chinese women composers
Jin dynasty (266–420) musicians
3rd-century Chinese musicians
Suicides in the Jin dynasty (266–420)